Jan Kvalheim (born 5 February 1963, Skien) is a former beach volleyball player from Norway, who represented his native country in two consecutive Summer Olympics: 1996 and 2000. Alongside Bjørn Maaseide he won several medals at the European Championships in the 1990s and became world champion in the 1994-1995 season. Kvalheim/Maaseide have 7 wins on the FIVB World Tour.

Kvalheim played pro volleyball in France in Arago Sète (1984–1989) and AS Cannes (1989–1992) and became French champion 2 times with AS Cannes and won the French cup in 1988 with Arago Sète.

Kvalheim is now working for Kvalheim/Maaseide as, which is part of World Event - and was the personal manager for John Arne Riise who plays football in Fulham FC. He was the press director for the FIVB Beach Volleyball World Championships in Stavanger 2009.

Playing partners
 Björn Maaseide
 Bard-Inge Pettersen
 Thierry Glowacz
 Iver Horrem

References
 
 

1963 births
Living people
Norwegian beach volleyball players
Beach volleyball players at the 1996 Summer Olympics
Beach volleyball players at the 2000 Summer Olympics
Olympic beach volleyball players of Norway
Sportspeople from Skien